Nicole Randall Johnson (born December 9, 1973) is an American actress, writer and producer. Johnson is most notable for her membership in the recurring cast of performers on the sketch comedy series MADtv.

Biography 
Johnson was born in Los Angeles, California. When she turned seven, Johnson's family left LA and she split the rest of her time growing up in Phoenix, Arizona, and later, Portland, Oregon. She attended the University of Arizona, where she majored in theatre. While pursuing her degree, she performed in a number of dramatic plays and was a member of the school's sketch and improv group, Comedy Corner.

After college, Johnson moved back to Los Angeles and began studying at The Groundlings School and Theatre, whose alumni include fellow MADtv cast members Phil LaMarr, Michael McDonald and Daniele Gaither. There she became a member of the Sunday Company, where she wrote and performed for a year before becoming a Series Regular on the acclaimed Bravo comedy series, Significant Others.

Johnson has had recurring roles on Key & Peele, Reno 911! and Andy Barker, P.I.. A few of her other television credits include guest-starring roles on Single Parents, Prime Suspect, Weeds, Curb Your Enthusiasm, Monk, CSI: Crime Scene Investigation, The Shield, Hannah Montana and Hot in Cleveland.

Johnson had supporting roles in such films as Murder Mystery, Role Models, The 40 Year Old Virgin, Transformers and In Her Shoes.

MADtv 
Johnson joined the cast of MADtv in 2005 as a feature performer and writer in the show's eleventh season. She became the third black female cast member in the show's history (Debra Wilson and Daniele Gaither were the first two respectively). She was promoted to repertory status for the show's twelfth season. Frequently recurring characters include Ka-Son and Darell, while her impersonations include Condoleezza Rice, Oprah Winfrey, Queen Latifah and Randy Jackson.

Original Characters
 Ka-son: A customer service rep who gets in verbal confrontations with unruly customers. Her many jobs include: Komkast Kable phone rep, 1-800-Gifts-and-Flowers phone rep, Nightclub Door-Person and TSA Airport Security.
 Darell: A man who relentlessly asks women for their phone number. The character is exceptionally recognized as one of the most popular characters on the show.

Celebrity impersonations
 Oprah Winfrey
 Queen Latifah
 Chris Rock
 Condoleezza Rice
 Randy Jackson
 Star Jones
 Tyra Banks
 Beyoncé Knowles (as Deena Jones from Dreamgirls)
 Chandra Wilson (as Dr. Miranda Bailey from Grey's Anatomy)
 Eddie Murphy (as Mama Klump from The Nutty Professor)
 Isabel Sanford (as Louise Jefferson from The Jeffersons)
 Mo'Nique
 New York

Filmography

Film/Movie

Television

Commercial Spokesperson Campaigns 

 Sierra Mist - In 2006, the lemon-lime flavored soft-drink line Sierra Mist by PepsiCo hired Johnson to join five other comedic performers—Michael Ian Black, Tracy Morgan, Jim Gaffigan, Guillermo Diaz, and Eliza Coupe—to portray the Sierra Mist comedy team, the Mist Takes, in a nationwide, multi-spot television ad campaign. Three commercials from the campaign, “Karate”, “Combover” and “Hospital Beds” debuted during Super Bowl XLI in 2007.
 DriveTime - In 2013, auto financing company DriveTime hired Johnson, along with comedienne/actress Katie Crown, for a "DriveTime Girls" ad campaign, each actress portraying one half of a comically eccentric duo of mobile credit approval agents "rescuing" potential car buyers rejected for financing by other auto dealers.

References

External links

1973 births
21st-century American actresses
Actresses from California
African-American actresses
American film actresses
American television actresses
American women comedians
Living people
University of Arizona alumni
American sketch comedians
Comedians from California
21st-century American comedians
21st-century African-American women
21st-century African-American people
20th-century African-American people
20th-century African-American women